Lloyd and Henry Warehouse, also known as Laney's Feed Mill, is a historic warehouse located at Huntingdon in Huntingdon County, Pennsylvania. It was built in 1863, and is 2 1/2-stories with a low pitched gable roof and full basement.  It measures .  It was built by the Pennsylvania Railroad and originally located along the Pennsylvania Canal and railroad line. It was moved to its present location in 1889, after the Johnstown Flood.

It was listed on the National Register of Historic Places in 1990.

References 

Industrial buildings and structures on the National Register of Historic Places in Pennsylvania
Industrial buildings completed in 1863
Buildings and structures in Huntingdon County, Pennsylvania
National Register of Historic Places in Huntingdon County, Pennsylvania
1863 establishments in Pennsylvania